Pacific Electric Railway Company Substation No. 8, also known as the Altadena Substation, is a former traction substation in Altadena, California. It operated under the Pacific Electric Railway and served as the substation for Pasadena area lines.

History  
The Pacific Electric traction substation was built in 1905. In addition to providing power to the PE lines, it also powered the Mount Lowe Railway.  In 1941, when PE sold its Pasadena area lines to Pasadena City Lines, a subsidiary of National City Lines, the substation was included in the sale.

The Substation was placed on the National Register of Historic Places in 1977 for its significance as a part of the Pacific Electric Railway. By 1999 it was being used as an office building.

Substation
Electric interurban and trolley cars required 600 volts direct current to operate a car's Direct Current (DC) traction motors. The function of a "substation" was to convert very high voltage alternating current (AC) from a power generating plant (often miles away) for an AC to lower voltage DC conversion. The high voltage AC entered the substation, was dropped in level by a transformer, and the resulting lower voltage AC was then fed to a device called a rotary converter for the conversion to 600 volts DC.

See also
Pacific Electric Sub-Station No. 14
Ivy Substation

References

External links
  - includes maps and images of the Altadena Substation

Altadena, California
Buildings and structures in Pasadena, California
Electrical substations
History of Los Angeles County, California
Buildings and structures on the National Register of Historic Places in Los Angeles County, California
Pacific Electric infrastructure
Railway buildings and structures on the National Register of Historic Places in California
Industrial buildings and structures on the National Register of Historic Places in California
Transportation buildings and structures in Los Angeles County, California